Geoffrey Mwambe is a Tanzanian CCM politician and a cabinet member. He is an elected MP for MASASI Urban in Mtwara region and was appointed by Tanzanian President John Magufuli in 2020 to serve as the Minister of Industry and Trade in December 2020. He was appointed as the head of the Tanzania Investment Center on 17 May 2017 before being elected a Member of Parliament for MASASI Urban and appointed in the cabinet after the 2020 Tanzanian general election. He continues to represent his people in MASASI Urban as their MP.

Geoffrey Idelphonce Mwambe is famously known for his open door policy, advocacy for private sector businesses and upholding ethical standards, innovation, creativity and public accountability.

References

Chama Cha Mapinduzi MPs
Tanzanian MPs 2020–2025
Nominated Tanzanian MPs
Government ministers of Tanzania
Chama Cha Mapinduzi politicians
Living people
1975 births
Tanzanian Roman Catholics